The Fazenda Pacatuba Private Natural Heritage Reserve is a private natural heritage reserve in the state of Paraíba, Brazil. It protects a population of red-handed howler monkeys.

Location

The Fazenda Pacatuba Private Natural Heritage Reserve in the municipality of Sapé, Paraíba in the Mata Paraibana mesoregion.
The property belongs to the Japungú distillery.

History

The Fazenda Pacatuba Private Natural Heritage Reserve  was created by decree 110-N of 29 December 1995.
The primate is endemic to Brazil and has two unconnected populations, one in the eastern Amazon region and the other in the Atlantic Forest north of the São Francisco River.

Environment

The reserve is in the Paraiba River basin.
Soil is Tertiary sediments of sand or sand-clay, with low fertility.
The climate is northeast coast tropical, dominated by humid air masses from the Atlantic Ocean.

The reserve contains one of the few remaining fragments of Atlantic Forest in the state of Paraíba.
Vegetation is mainly seasonal semi-deciduous forest, with two types of formation.
A study published in 2013 reported 24 species of ferns in 18 genera.

Notes

Sources

Private natural heritage reserves of Brazil
Protected areas established in 1995
1995 establishments in Brazil
Protected areas of Paraíba